Reopening the Gates is the fifth studio album by American heavy metal band Omen, released in 1997 by Massacre. Kenny Powell is the only original Omen member playing on the album, and also the producer of it.

Track listing

Personnel
Omen
 Greg Powell – vocals, guitars
 Kenny Powell – guitars
 Andy Haas – bass
 Rick Murray – drums

Production
 Kenny Powell – production, engineering
 Greg Powell – assistant engineering
 Matt Story – graphic design
 Michael Insuaste – photography

References

1997 albums
Omen (band) albums
Massacre Records albums
Groove metal albums